Events in the year 1911 in India.

Incumbents
 Emperor of India – George V
 Viceroy of India – Charles Hardinge, 1st Baron Hardinge of Penshurst

Events
 National income - 11,822 million
 December 11 - Coronation ceremonies in new capital of India, New Delhi, site of Humayun's Tomb
 18 February – Henri Pequet, flying a Humber biplane, carried mail from Allahabad to Naini junction which was the first flight in India.
 29 July – Mohun Bagan was the first Indian team and the first Asian team to have defeated a foreign team when they won the 1911 IFA Shield defeating East Yorkshire Regiment 2–1 to lift the IFA Shield.
 29 August – The Diocese of Kottayam was erected on this day (Kerala, India) for the Knanaya Catholic people of the Syro-Malabar Church. In 2005 the diocese was raised to the rank of Archdiocese.
 11 December – Coronation in New Delhi of George V and Queen Mary as Emperor of India and Empress consort respectively.
 12 December – The Delhi Durbar is held, formally announcing the coronation of George V, and his assumption of title Emperor of India.
 12 December – The capital of India is shifted to New Delhi from Calcutta (now Kolkata).
 27 December – The Jana Gana Mana, which would become free India's national anthem, is sung for the first time, at the Indian National Congress annual convention at Calcutta.
 The first Urdu language typewriter is made available.
 The Tata family starts the first steel mill in Bihar.

Law
 Re-enactment with modifications of the Seditious Meetings Act
Geneva Convention Act (British statute)

Births
31 July – Pannalal Ghosh, flute (bānsurī) player and composer (died 1960).
21 August – Sawai Man Singh II of Jaipur, last ruling Maharaja of Jaipur (died 1970).
11 September – Lala Amarnath, cricketer (died 2000).
20 September – Shriram Sharma Acharya, seer, sage and Founder of the All World Gayatri Pariwar (died 1990).
12 October – Vijay Merchant, cricketer (died 1987).
13 October – Ashok Kumar, actor (died 2001).
28 October – Piara Singh Gill, physicist (died 2002).
6 December – Dinesh Gupta, freedom fighter and revolutionary, executed (died 1931).

Full date unknown
Narayan Apte, accomplice in assassination of Mahatma Gandhi, executed (died 1949).
Rappal Sangameswaraier Krishnan, scientist and researcher (died 1999).

Deaths
31 August – Mahbub Ali Khan, Asaf Jah VI, sixth Nizam of Hyderabad (born 1866).

References

 
India
Years of the 20th century in India